Michael Burleigh (born 3 April 1955) is an English author and historian whose primary focus is on Nazi Germany and related subjects. He has also been active in bringing history to television.

Early life
Michael Burleigh was born on 3 April 1955. He was awarded a first class honours degree in medieval and modern history from University College London in 1977, winning the Pollard, Dolley and Sir William Mayer Prizes.

Career
After a PhD in medieval history from Bedford College, London in 1982, he held posts at New College, Oxford, the London School of Economics and then at Cardiff University, where he was a distinguished research professor in modern history. He has also been Professor of History at Washington and Lee University in Virginia, and Kratter Visiting Professor at Stanford University. In 2002 he gave the three Cardinal Basil Hume Memorial Lectures at Heythrop College, University of London.

Burleigh is a member of the Academic Advisory Board of the Institut für Zeitgeschichte in Munich and a Fellow of the Royal Historical Society. He founded the journal Totalitarian Movements and Political Religions and is on the editorial boards of Totalitarismus und Demokratie and Ethnic and Racial Studies. Books of his have been translated into Czech, Chinese, Croatian, Danish, Dutch, Estonian, Finnish, French, German, Hebrew, Hungarian, Italian, Japanese, Polish and Spanish.

He has also been active in bringing history to television audiences. In 1991 he won the British Film Institute Award for Archival Achievement for the Channel 4/Domino Films documentary Selling Murder: The Killing Films of the Third Reich. In 1993 he gained a New York Film and Television Festival Award Bronze Medal for Heil Herbie: The Story of the Volkswagen Beetle (Channel 4/Domino Films).

Burleigh is on the advisory board of the magazine Standpoint and contributes regularly. He won the Samuel Johnson Prize for Non Fiction in 2001 for The Third Reich: A New History and the Nonino International Master of His Time Prize in 2012. David Cesarani praised the book's masterful synthesis in Literary Review, noting how Burleigh grafts a thorough command of relevant memoirs onto quantitative data and theories of totalitarianism, providing "one arresting anecdote after another to personalise the bigger argument."

His Small Wars, Far Away Places: The Genesis of the Modern World 1945–65 was long-listed for the Samuel Johnson Prize in 2013. He writes for three English dailies: The Times, the Daily Mail and the Daily Telegraph.

Personal life
Burleigh has been married since 1991 to Linden Burleigh. They live in South East London.

Selected works
Selling Murder: The Killing Films of the Third Reich. London: Domino Films
Prussian Society and the German Order. Cambridge University Press, 1984
Germany Turns Eastwards: A Study of Ostforschung in the Third Reich. Cambridge University Press, 1988
The Racial State: Germany 1933–1945 – with Wolfgang Wippermann. Cambridge University Press, 1991
Death and Deliverance: Euthanasia in Germany 1900–1945. Cambridge University Press, 1994
Ethics and Extermination: Reflections on Nazi Genocide. Cambridge University Press, 1997
Confronting the Nazi Past. St Martin's Press, 1995
The Third Reich: A New History. Macmillan, 2000
Earthly Powers: Religion and Politics in Europe from the French Revolution to the Great War. HarperCollins, 2005 
Sacred Causes: Religion and Politics from the European Dictators to Al Qaeda. HarperCollins, 2006 
Blood and Rage: A Cultural History of Terrorism. Harper Collins, 2008
Moral Combat: A History of World War II. Harper, 2010 
Small Wars, Far Away Places: The Genesis of the Modern World 1945–65. Viking Press, 2013
Day of the Assassins: A History of Political Assassination. Picador, 2021.

See also
Nazi eugenics

References

External links

Biography and commentaries at cosmopolis.ch
Articles by Michael Burleigh on the 5th Estate blog

1955 births
20th-century English historians
21st-century English historians
Alumni of University College London
Academics of the London School of Economics
Fellows of New College, Oxford
Rutgers University faculty
Stanford University Department of History faculty
Fellows of the Royal Historical Society
Living people
Historians of World War II
Historians of Nazism
Washington and Lee University faculty